Scorzonera is a genus of flowering plants in the tribe Cichorieae within the family Asteraceae.

They are distributed in Europe, Asia, and Africa. Its center of diversity is in the Mediterranean. Well-known species include the edible black salsify (Scorzonera hispanica). Scorzonera tau-saghyz is a source of natural rubber.

Scorzonera is recorded as a food plant for the larva of the Nutmeg, a species of moth.

Species 
The genus contains the following species.

Etymology

One possible origin of the genus name is the French scorzonère ("viper’s grass").

Secondary metabolites 
Some Scorzonera species contain lactones, including members of the guaianolide class of sesquiterpene lactones. Flavonoids found in Scorzonera include apigenin, kaempferol, luteolin, and quercetin. Other secondary metabolites reported from the genus include caffeoylquinic acids, coumarins, lignans, stilbenoids, and triterpenoids. One unique class of stilbenoid derivative was first isolated from Scorzonera humilis. They were named the tyrolobibenzyls after Tyrol in the eastern Alps, where the plant was collected.

References 

Asteraceae genera
Cichorieae